The Samurai-dokoro (侍所 - Board of Retainers) was an office of the Kamakura and Muromachi shogunates. The role of the Samurai-dokoro was to take the leadership of gokenin, the shogun's retainers, and to be in charge of the imprisonment of criminals. It was established in 1180 by Minamoto no Yoritomo, the founder of the Kamakura shogunate.

History

Kamakura period 
During the Kamakura period, the Samurai-dokoro was in charge of calling in and directing the gokenin, the shogun's retainers. It was also in charge of the imprisonment of criminals.

The office was administered by officials called shoshi or samuraidokoro-no-tsukasa, who were made up from the most powerful gokenin. The most senior of the officials, the president of the Samurai-dokoro, was called bettō. The office was established by Minamoto no Yoritomo in 1180, who appointed Wada Yoshimori its first bettō. However, after Yoshimori was killed during the Wada Rebellion, the shikken (regent of the shogunate) took over the post of bettō.

In the Engyobon Heike Monogatari, the Samurai-dokoro was established upon the request of Wada Yoshimori, and it was modeled after the Taira government period office called samurai bettō that Fujiwara no Tadakiyo was appointed to rule over the samurai of the eight provinces of Bandō (present-day Kantō region). If this is true, the Samurai-dokoro was not modeled after the household agency of noble families that shares the same name.

As Yoritomo's position rose, the Samurai-dokoro began to also take on the role of a domestic administration institution. In the Kenkyū era, Wada Yoshimori, the bettō, was in charge of military affairs in general as well as domestic administration, and Kajiwara Kagetoki, a shoshi, was in charge of directing the gokenin, the basis of the Kamakura shogunate.

Muromachi period 
Under the Muromachi shogunate, the Samurai-dokoro was led by a tōnin or shoshi, who was assisted by a shoshi-dai. Bugyōnin was in charge of administrative paperwork, and there were junior officers, kodoneri, zōshiki, and others. Additionally, kaikō took on the duties of a clerk, metsuke worked as an inspector, and yoriudo took on the duties of an investigator, among other officials.

The Samurai-dokoro was largely dependent on the military power of the daimyo, and in reality the shoshi-dai, a high-ranking retainer of the shoshi, was in charge of the Samurai-dokoro. During events like the Tsuchi-ikki peasant uprising, a powerful military was required to suppress the chaotic situation, and in such cases the Samurai-dokoro asked help from the daimyo and the kenmon (powerful families).

Between the late Muromachi period and the Sengoku period, shoshi and shoshi-dai were no longer appointed, and the kaikō was in turn charge of the Samurai-dokoro. The shogunate bugyōnin was appointed this post and was either from the Matsuda clan or the Īno'o clan. The kaikō was required to stay in Kyoto and be in charge of Kyoto's public security and the management of prisons, and also served as an advisor to the shogun and other kenmon on judgements. Additionally, after mid-Muromachi period, the kaikō formed its own military by recruiting local Kyoto jizamurai and skilled vagrants. After the Ōnin War (1467-77), the military power of the shoshi weakened, and the kaikō's hikan and the officials of another Samurai-dokoro took over the public security. Additionally, the military power of the kaikō directly played a part in the military power of the Ashikaga shoguns, and according to the records at the time, the kaikō could mobilize an estimated 200 to 300 men.

Bettō

Tōnin

References

Ashikaga shōguns
Government of feudal Japan
Kamakura shōguns